The Macartney–MacDonald Line was a boundary proposal by the British Raj for the border between the princely state of Jammu and Kashmir and the Chinese-managed territories of Xinjiang and Tibet. Broadly, it represented the watershed between the Indus River system and the rivers draining into the Tarim basin (the Yarkand and Karakash rivers). The line was proposed by British Indian Government to China in 1899 via its envoy in China, Sir Claude MacDonald. The Chinese Government never gave any response to the proposal. The Indian Government believed that, subsequently British India reverted to its traditional boundary, the Johnson–Ardagh Line. Independent scholars have not confirmed the claim.

It remains relevant today as a possible resolution for the Sino-Indian border dispute in the region of Aksai Chin.

History 

The Survey of India surveyor William Johnson, who was asked to survey the Kashmir area up to the "Chinese boundary", drew a border line that later came to be called the "Johnson Line". This line put the Aksai Chin regon in Kashmir. The border was accepted by China for several decades. In 1893, Hung Ta-chen, the Chinese envoy at St. Petersburg, gave maps of the region to George Macartney, the British consul at Kashgar, which coincided with it in broad details.

However, by 1896, China showed interest in Aksai Chin, reportedly with Russian instigation. As part of The Great Game between Britain and Russia, Britain favoured a revision of the prevailing boundary, ceding underpopulated border territory to be "filled out" by China. It was initially suggested by Macartney in Kashgar and developed by the Governor General of India Lord Elgin. The new boundary placed the Lingzi Tang plains, which are south of the Laktsang range, in India, and Aksai Chin proper, which is north of the Laktsang range, in China. The British presented this line, currently called the Macartney–MacDonald line, to the Chinese in a note by Sir Claude MacDonald, the British envoy in Peking. The Qing government did not respond to the note. Scholars Fisher, Rose and Huttenback comment:

The Macartney–MacDonald Line is a partial basis of the Sino-Pakistan Agreement. It has been suggested that a solution to the Sino-Indian border dispute could also be based on the Macartney–MacDonald Line.

Description 
The Macartney–MacDonald line is described as follows:

Notes

References

Bibliography

Further reading
 

China–India border
1893 in international relations
1959 in international relations
Eponymous border lines